Alphonse Dunn (September 27, 1911 – September 29, 2004), nicknamed "Blue", was an American Negro league first baseman between 1937 and 1943.

A native of Baton Rouge, Louisiana, Dunn made his Negro leagues debut in 1937 for the Detroit Stars. In 1942 and 1943, he played for the Birmingham Black Barons, and appeared in two games of the 1943 Negro World Series for Birmingham. In 1946, he played for the Portland Rosebuds of the West Coast Negro Baseball Association. Dunn died in Laurel, Mississippi in 2004 at age 93.

References

External links
 and Seamheads

1911 births
2004 deaths
Birmingham Black Barons players
Detroit Stars (1937) players
New York Cubans players
Baseball first basemen
Baseball players from Baton Rouge, Louisiana
20th-century African-American sportspeople
21st-century African-American people
Portland Rosebuds (baseball) players